Debra Jones Ringold (born September 8, 1954) is a professor  at the Atkinson Graduate School of Management at Willamette University and is a marketing research consultant. She was selected to advise the U.S. Census Bureau on methods for improving Census participation, data collection methodology and communication of Census data to the public.

Ringold is the JELD-WEN Professor of Free Enterprise at Willamette University, where she teaches classes in private, public and nonprofit sector marketing; marketing research; marketing communications; and marketing and public policy. She has served on the editorial board of the Journal of Public Policy since 1991, including a three-year term as its associate editor. In 2000, she was elected to the American Marketing Association board of directors, completing a term as chairperson in 2007; she also serves on the executive council for the National Association of Schools of Public Affairs and Administration from 2010 to 2013.

Education
Ringold earned her B.A. in zoology from Texas Tech University in 1977. She went on to attend Southern Illinois University, where she worked as a fine arts programmer and student affairs administrator both during and after earning her M.B.A. in 1979. While teaching and producing a wide range of events – including dance, theater, film and contemporary art exhibits – she became increasingly intrigued by the marketing aspects of her job. In 1982, she enrolled at the University of Maryland, where she developed an interest in investigating the intersection of marketing and public policy. She earned her Ph.D. in 1986.

Research and consulting
Ringold's research focuses on how regulation of commercial activity affects consumer behavior. Her work has been published in the Journal of Marketing, Journal of Public Policy and Marketing, Journal of Advertising, Journal of Macromarketing and Journal of Consumer Policy, among others. In 2008, her expertise in public policy and consumer behavior led to her appointment to the U.S. Census Bureau Advisory Council. She has also worked with the Federal Trade Commission and the U.S. Food and Drug Administration to evaluate how their regulations impact consumers. 

Ringold offers marketing consulting services to consumer package goods firms and large nonprofit organizations, including Anheuser-Busch Companies, Canadian Broadcasting Corporation, and Hewlett-Packard.

Politics and community
Ringold ran for Oregon State Representative, 35th District, on the Republican ticket in 2000. Her campaign centered on a commitment to strengthening education funding in both K-12 and higher education; improving quality of life for Oregonians; and promoting equal opportunity by supporting pay equity, job creation affordable housing and improved access to affordable health care. Before running for office, she had served on the Corvallis School Board Budget Committee and Task Forces as well as the Wilson Elementary School Site Council.

Throughout her career, Ringold has remained active in the community. In addition to serving as a board member for Oregon Women MBAs and past board member for Greenlight Greater Portland, Oregon (2008 to 2009), she has been a board member for Corvallis Caring Place Nonprofit Assisted Living Facility, Family Building Blocks Relief Nursery and United Way of Benton County. She also has served as a steering committee member for Corvallis Kids Count and PTA President for Wilson Elementary School.

Awards
 Ringold's teaching awards include the Jerry E. Hudson Distinguished Teaching Award (1997) and the United Methodist Award for Exemplary Teaching and Community Service (2002).
 She was recognized for her outstanding research in 2004 with the Thomas C. Kinnear / Journal of Public Policy and Marketing Award.
 In 2005, Ringold was honored as the Administrator of the Year at Willamette University.
 Portland Business Journal presented Ringold with its Orchid Award, which recognizes outstanding women in the business community, in 2009 during an April 23 ceremony at the Oregon Convention Center.

Publications
 Ringold, D.J. (2016), “Assumptions about Consumers, Producers, and Regulators:  What They Tell Us about Ourselves,” Journal of the Association for Consumer Research, 1 (3), 341-354.
 Maltz, E., Thompson, F. and Ringold, D.J. (2011), "Assessing and maximizing corporate social initiatives: a strategic view of corporate social responsibility," Journal of Public Affairs, 11 (n/a), 384-392.
 Ringold, D.J. (2008), "Le Mieux Est L'ennemi Du Bien," Journal of Public Policy and Marketing, 27 (2), 197-201.
 Ringold, D.J. (2008) “Responsibility and Brand Advertising in the Alcohol Beverage Market:  The Modeling of Normative Drinking Behavior,” Journal of Advertising, 37 (1), 127-141.
 Ringold, D.J. and B. Weitz (2007), “The American Marketing Association Definition of Marketing:  Moving from Lagging to Leading Indicator,” Journal of Public Policy and Marketing, 26 (2), 251-260.
 Ringold, D.J. (2006), “The Morality of Markets, Marketing, and the Corporate Purpose,” in Does Marketing Need Reform?, Jagdish N. Sheth and Rajendra S. Sisodia, eds., Armonk, NY:  M.E. Sharpe, 64-68.
 Ringold, D.J. (2005), “Vulnerability in the Marketplace:  Concepts, Caveats, and Possible Solutions,” Journal of Macromarketing, 25 (2), 202-214.

References

External links
 Debra Ringold Willamette University Atkinson Graduate School of Management Profile, Atkinson Graduate School of Management
 Debra receiving the 2009 Women in Business award, Portland Business Journal
 Debra Jones Ringold Willamette University Profile, Willamette University

1954 births
Living people
People from Houston
Southern Illinois University alumni
Texas Tech University alumni
Willamette University faculty
University of Maryland, College Park alumni